Karl Peter Brazil (born 27 May 1977, Solihull) is an English session drummer.

He is best known as the drummer for the British indie rock band Feeder, replacing the band's previous drummer Mark Richardson. He often works with other pop and rock artists, both on tour and in the studio.

Childhood
Brazil was raised in a musical family, and was influenced by them at a young age.

Personal life
Born in Solihull, he is a dedicated supporter of Birmingham City F.C.

Instruments
Brazil currently uses Gretsch drums, Sabian cymbals, Roland electronic drums, Remo drumheads, DW hardware LP percussion and Vic Firth drumsticks.

Associated acts

Feeder
James Blunt
Take That
Robbie Williams
Leona Lewis
Natalie Imbruglia
Girls Aloud
Elton John
Westlife
Jason Mraz
James Morrison
Ben's Brother
Paloma Faith
Starsailor
Olly Murs
Alison Moyet

Discography
Some Kind of Trouble - James Blunt
Renegades - Feeder
''All Bright Electric - Feeder

References

External links

English rock drummers
English session musicians
Feeder members
Living people
People from Solihull
1977 births
Robbie Williams Band members
21st-century drummers